The seventh season of the television comedy series The Middle began airing on September 23, 2015, on ABC in the United States. It is produced by Blackie and Blondie Productions and Warner Bros. Television with series creators DeAnn Heline and Eileen Heisler as executive producers.

The show is about Frances "Frankie" Heck (Patricia Heaton), a middle-class, middle-aged Midwestern woman married to Michael "Mike" Heck (Neil Flynn) who resides in the small fictional town of Orson, Indiana. They are the parents of three children, Axl (Charlie McDermott), Sue (Eden Sher), and Brick (Atticus Shaffer).

Cast

Main cast
 Patricia Heaton as Frankie Heck
 Neil Flynn as Mike Heck
 Charlie McDermott as Axl Heck
 Eden Sher as Sue Heck
 Atticus Shaffer as Brick Heck

Recurring
 Alphonso McAuley as Charles "Hutch" Hutchinson, Axl's football teammate and best friend at college. His full name is revealed this season. 
 Tommy Bechtold as Kenny, Axl and Hutch's weird roommate, a hardcore gamer. He speaks for the first time in "Halloween VI: Tick Tock Death".
 Casey Burke as Cindy Hornberger, Brick's classmate, with whom he is in the early stages of a relationship.    
 Daniela Bobadilla as Lexie Brooks, Sue's closest friend at college who becomes her second roommate and is an incredibly kind rich little girl.
 Jen Ray as Nancy Donahue, the Hecks' neighbor and friend.
 Pat Finn as Bill Norwood, the Hecks' neighbor and friend.
 Julie Brown as Paula Norwood, the Hecks' neighbor and friend.
 Beau Wirick as Sean Donahue, one of Axl's friends who is away at college. He shows up this season with a hipster look and claims he is now a vegan.
 Gia Mantegna as Devin Levin, Frankie's hairdresser's relative and Axl's college classmate/ex-girlfriend. They break up when Devin thinks they should see others.
 Brittany Ross and Natalie Lander as Courtney and Debbie, airheaded cheerleaders who dated Axl as one in high school.
 Paul Hipp as Reverend Timothy "TimTom" Thomas, a youth pastor at the Hecks' church.
 Jack McBrayer as Dr. Ted Goodwin, Frankie's boss at the dental office.
 Jovan Armand as Troy, Brick's tall, heavyset classmate who initially protects him at school, then becomes his friend.

Guest
 Norm Macdonald as Rusty Heck, Mike's brother.
 Brooke Shields as Rita Glossner, the Hecks' uncouth and troubled neighbor.
 Marsha Mason as Pat Spence, Frankie's mother.
 Faith Ford as Sheila, Frankie's co-worker at Heritage Village.
 John Cullum as "Big Mike" Heck, Mike's father.
 Cheryl Hines as Dr. Sommer Samuelson, head of the company that takes over Frankie's dental office.
 Alan Ruck as Jack Kershaw, Axl's boss at Little Betty.
 Brian Stepanek as Merv, Cindy's father.
 Lauren Drasler as LuEllen, Cindy's mother.
 Emily Rutherfurd as Dierdre Peterson, the Hecks' new neighbor.

Episodes

Notes

References

The Middle (TV series)
2015 American television seasons
2016 American television seasons